Revazishvili is a Georgian surname that may refer to:

 Giorgi Revazishvili (born 1977), Georgian footballer
 Giorgi Revazishvili (born 1974), Georgian judoka

Georgian-language surnames